The Social Security and National Insurance Trust, is an agency of the government of Ghana.  Its job description, according to its website, is to administrate the National Pension Scheme. In so doing, the trust owns major amounts of stock in Ghana's principal companies.

Investments

Stock Portfolio
For example, the trust owns:
 10% of Accra Brewery Company Limited; 
 25% of Aluworks; 
 30% of Ghana Commercial Bank; 
 20% of HFC Bank;  and
 20% of SG-SSB (SG Social Security Bank).
 10% of Africa World Airlines; 
 40% of West Hills Mall.

End of lump sum payment 
From 1 January 2020 all workers who attain the age of 60 years would not receive the lump sum payment anymore as was stated in PNDC Law 247. The lump sum payments had been transferred to the second tier fund managers.

References

External links
 Social Security and National Insurance Trust website
 Index of Ghana company PDFs from Gold Coast Securities

1965 establishments in Ghana
Financial services in Ghana
Ministries and Agencies of State of Ghana
Government agencies established in 1965
Pension funds